Robert George (10 June 1893 – 23 October 1985) was a French ice hockey player. He competed in the men's tournament at the 1928 Winter Olympics. He was a friend of René Lacoste, and designed the crocodile logo on the Lacoste tennis shirt.

References

External links
 

1893 births
1985 deaths
Ice hockey players at the 1928 Winter Olympics
Olympic ice hockey players of France